Reremoana School is a Primary School (years 1-8) in Wattle Downs, a suburb in the Manurewa Ward, Auckland Region, New Zealand. Reremoana was opened on February 8, 2006 to cater for the rapidly growing population due to new development in the area. The school enrolment zone encompasses the Wattle Cove area and a large portion of the Wattle Downs precinct.

The school currently has 20 classroom spaces, which operate as hubs of two in each team.

Symbolism 
The school carries the ancestral name of Reremoana Te Māhia, the daughter of Te Wirihana and granddaughter of Ihaka Takaanini. Their names are recognized as Wiri and Takaanini locally. Translated, Reremoana means ‘waters flowing to the sea’.

The school's layout is designed to be shaped like a kite, alluding to a local legend of a kite flying competition in which a kite line was severed and drifted away. The owner of the kite was Chief Tamapahore, who had a pā (fortified village) on Matuku-tururu (Wiri Mountain).

Principals 
2006 - 2013: Viki Holley
2014 - 2015: Lisa Harland
2017 - Present Day: Julie Cowan

Houses & Teams 
Reremoana is split up into 4 houses and 5 teams

Houses 

 Kauri (Blue)
 Rimu - (Red)
 Totara - (Green)
 Kowhai - (Yellow)

The houses are named after native trees in New Zealand

Teams 

 Kiwi - (Year 0-1)
 Piwakaka - (Year 1-2)
 Pukeko - (Year 3-4)
 Tui - (Year 4-6)
 Kereru (Year 6-8)

The teams are named after native birds in New Zealand

Notes

External links
Reremoana School Website
Primary schools in Auckland